Justo de las Cuevas (September 1931 – 25 August 2022) was a Spanish politician who served as a Deputy. He was born in Bárcena de Pie de Concha, Cantabria, Spain and was a prominent member of the Spanish transition to democracy and of the autonomic process in Cantabria.

References

1931 births
2022 deaths
Members of the constituent Congress of Deputies (Spain)
Members of the 1st Congress of Deputies (Spain)
Presidents of the Parliament of Cantabria
Members of the Parliament of Cantabria
Union of the Democratic Centre (Spain) politicians
Businesspeople from Cantabria
People from the Besaya Valley